Charles A. Gaetano Stadium is a multi-purpose stadium located on the Utica University campus in Utica, New York.  The facility was completed in 2001.

Usage and facilities 
It is  the home to the Utica Pioneers football, field hockey, lacrosse and soccer teams.  The venue also hosts various intramural athletic events.  

The stadium has a modern field turf playing surface and a grandstand that holds 1,200 fans.  The facility bears the name of the emeritus director of the Utica College Foundation.

External links 
 Utica College stadium page

Utica University
Buildings and structures in Utica, New York
College lacrosse venues in the United States
Multi-purpose stadiums in the United States
Sports venues completed in 2001
Sports venues in Oneida County, New York
College football venues
American football venues in New York (state)
College field hockey venues in the United States
Lacrosse venues in New York (state)
College soccer venues in the United States
Soccer venues in New York (state)
2001 establishments in New York (state)